Trade journalism reports on the movements and developments of the business world by way of articles or analysis. Trade journalism also refers to industry-specific news, such as exclusive focus on commodities (e.g. oil, gas and metals) or sectors (finance, travel, food). Due to its business nature, trade journalism is often expected to process and interpret a substantial amount of market commentary.

Types of journalism